Camden County High School is the only public high school for Camden County, Georgia, United States, serving grades 9-12. It is located beside the Camden Recreational Center.

References

External links 
Camden County Board of Education

Schools in Camden County, Georgia
Public high schools in Georgia (U.S. state)
1973 establishments in Georgia (U.S. state)
Educational institutions established in 1973